Supercluster: The Big Dipper Anthology is a 3-disc release by Boston indie rock band Big Dipper, released March 18, 2008 by Merge Records. The set contains the band's debut EP, Boo-Boo, and their first two full-length albums, Heavens and Craps. Supercluster also contains various bonus tracks and 15 songs which were recorded after their final album, Slam.

The album's liner notes were written by Tom Scharpling of Scharpling and Wurster.

The song "Winsor Dam" was covered by Gigolo Aunts on the "Mrs. Washington" single, and included on that band's Where I Find My Heaven compilation album.

Track listing

2008 compilation albums
Big Dipper (band) albums
Indie rock compilation albums